The Lioness is the fourth studio album by Songs: Ohia. It was released by Secretly Canadian on January 17, 2000. A reissue of the album, Love & Work: The Lioness Sessions, was released on November 23, 2018.

Production
The album was recorded by Andy Miller at Chem 19 Studios in Glasgow, Scotland, with Alasdair Roberts, Geof Comings, Jonathan Cargill, and members of Arab Strap.

Critical reception
Exclaim! thought that "the transatlantic recording session inspired Molina to produce what is both his darkest and cheerful record to date." The Austin Chronicle called the album "quiet and reflective, numbing and resolute, with writing as simple and straightforward as an ice pick under the ribs." The Sunday Times wrote that "Songs: Ohia's slug- paced folk-blues owe an obvious debt to the spectral yowling of Will Oldham's Palace Brothers, but The Lioness still has the power to turn the most brightly lit room a delicate shade of blue."

Track listing
All songs written by Jason Molina.

Original release 
 "The Black Crow" – 7:16
 "Tigress" – 3:20
 "Nervous Bride" – 2:43
 "Being in Love" – 5:41
 "Lioness" – 6:37
 "Coxcomb Red" – 4:05
 "Back on Top" – 4:22
 "Baby Take a Look" – 3:06
 "Just a Spark" – 2:19

Love & Work: The Lioness Sessions 

 "The Black Crow" – 7:16
 "Tigress" – 3:20
 "Nervous Bride" – 2:43
 "Being in Love" – 5:41
 "Lioness" – 6:37
 "Coxcomb Red" – 4:05
 "Back on Top" – 4:22
 "Baby Take a Look" – 3:06
 "Just a Spark" – 2:19
 "On My Way Home" (Lioness sessions outtake) – 3:01
 "Never Fake It" (Lioness sessions outtake) – 3:10
 "From the Heart" (Lioness sessions outtake) – 4:28
 "It Gets Harder Over Time" (Lioness sessions outtake) – 2:12
 "I Promise Not to Quit" (Lioness sessions outtake) – 5:44
 "Neighbors of Our Age" (Lioness sessions outtake) – 2:43
 "Pyrate II (Even Now)" (Lioness sessions outtake) – 4:08
 "Velvet Marching Band" (Lissy's sessions) – 3:00
 "Raw" (Lissy's sessions) – 3:46
 "Already Through" (Lissy's sessions) – 4:00
 "Wonderous Love" (Lissy's sessions) – 2:20

Personnel
 Jason Molina
 Jonathan Cargill
 Geof Comings
 David Gow
 Aidan Moffat
 Alasdair Roberts
 Engineered by Andy Miller

References 

2000 albums
Jason Molina albums
Secretly Canadian albums